Virtual Chess 64 is a chess simulation game for the Nintendo 64. It was released in 1998. The game features no true "completion" in the form of a goal or a score, so one could theoretically play an endless number of matches. When a piece is captured, a short animated cutscene plays back depicting the battle, as in 1988's Battle Chess.

Features

Virtual Chess 64 comes with a basic text and visual tutorial written for beginners and novices about how to play chess. In the third section the tutorial continues explaining how to play using simple chess positions in which the player must find the best move. The fourth section is an analysis of "Fool's mate" and "Scholar's mate". In the fifth and sixth sections these chess problems become increasingly complicated, and the player is expected to find the solution and understand it. The seventh section is about basic endgame checkmating approaches and patterns, and just one basic endgame concept for beginners: the square of the promoting pawn. The last three sections focus on improving opening, middlegame, and endgame chess play by using example games for analysis.

A full game can be played using either a 2D or 3D board. There is a "Rotate Board" option for the 2D and 3D boards, although the C-left and C-right buttons can be used to rotate the 3D board by a greater variety of angle measures. On the 3D board every time a piece is captured is accompanied by a short cutscene depicting the capture unless this is disabled or limited to one-time only per piece capture combination. There are no cutscenes on the 2D board for captures. Players can change the design of the pieces and board and use the "flash think" and last move square lights. There are four 2D chess sets to select from. Players can create scenarios by adding or removing pieces from the board and placing them in different positions, but there is a bug removing the option to castle in games customized through this feature. The game supports two players, and also the option of seeing the chess engine play itself.

The game also has a "Level" option in which players can set the time taken for the chess engine to respond based on the complexity of the position. Time is the only real factor behind the quality of the engine's moves, and while the default difficulty level results in analysis in a matter of seconds, the "Level 12" setting results in waiting times greatly varying based on the position. There is a "Meditation" setting by which, if enabled, the chess engine will think on the player's time except usually during the opening phase of the game in which predefined moves are played. Again based on the complexity of the position, analysis will continue for a matter of hours or days until either a forced checkmate is found or the player makes a move.

Development
Development on the game started as early as June 1997.

Critical reaction

The game received mixed reviews according to the review aggregation website GameRankings. Nintendo Power gave it a mixed review, a few months before the game was released Stateside.

Critics stated that although Virtual Chess 64 may not be for those who aren't into chess, it was so thorough in features and gameplay that it was worthwhile to any kind of chess player, including newcomers wanting to get into the game. The game's opponent AI was praised, with critics claiming it to be hard to beat even on lower difficulty levels; writers such as Hyper staff Ross Clarksmith and N64 Magazine journalist Tim Weaver opined that it made Virtual Chess a worthy alternative to playing chess in real life with another human. The tutorial feature was another common spotlight, with reviews rejoicing that its interactive-ness made learning the rules easy for beginner players and offered several strategies and tactics for intermediate to advanced players. Mark Skorupa of Gamezilla, a gamer who never played chess before, admitted he understood the rules successfully thanks to the tutorial, although had a minor complaint of the content being over-detailed.

IGN writer Peer Schneider wrote that, despite flicker in the alternate 2D chess boards, the game looked mostly high-res. Weaver, on the other hand, critiqued other parts of the visuals, such as the menus that look "scribbled on with felt tips" and the "hideous" Titus animations in the tutorials.

The 3D chess board garnered numerous complaints. Crispin Boyer was disoriented by its "awkward perspectives", and Josh Smith and Scott Alan Marriott noted the 3D pieces were difficult to identify which Marriott attributed to their "carved" look. Skorupa, although opining piece distinguishing was more difficult in the 2D mode than the 3D, claimed figuring out positions of pieces was hard on the 3D board. The 3D camera controls were panned as limited, with Smith annoyed that the player could only rotate in 360 degrees and in one direction. Reviewers also suggested the game should've had a higher amount of 3D boards.

Most reviewers particularly bashed the chess-piece-clearing animations, unfavorably comparing them to those in Battle Chess; they were labeled as gimmicks that were "repetitive," "annoying," lost their appeal quickly, looked "jerky and slow" and "shamefully amateur"; Smith opined the only way for them to stay appealing is if they were fully-rendered in-game animations instead of separate video cutscenes. The segments, however, garnered a few positive commenters; Schneider described them as a far cry from Battle Chess, but they manage to be funny for a while and kids will probably dig them, and Skorupa wrote they were nicely done and looked great, but after a few games the players will turn them off.

Notes

References

External links
 

1998 video games
Chess software
Nintendo 64 games
Nintendo 64-only games
Titus Software games
Video games developed in France